Gérard Watkins (born 4 July 1965) is an English-French actor, playwright, director, and songwriter.

He graduated from Lycée de St Germain en Laye in 1983.

As a stage actor, he has performed in over forty productions in Paris with such directors as Véronique Bellegarde, Julie Beres, Jean-Claude Buchard, Elizabeth Chailloux, Michel Didym, André Engel, Frederic Fisbach, Marc François, Daniel Jeanneteau, Philipe Lanton, Jean-Louis Martinelli, Lars Noren, Claude Régy, Yann Ritsema, Bernard Sobel,  Viviane Theophilides, and Jean-Pierre Vincent.

Among his critically acclaimed performances are Ian in Sarah Kane's Blasted, Edmond in King Lear, and Rosalind in As You Like It. In the cinema, he is perhaps best known for his role in the 2008 film Taken as Patrice Saint Clair, the sex trafficking kingpin who runs the operation that kidnapped the protagonist's 17-year-old daughter, but he has also performed with directors such as Julie Lopes-Curval, Jérome Salle, Yann Samuel, Julian Schnabel, Hugo Santiago, and Peter Watkins. Since 1994, he has directed his own theatre company, the Perdita Ensemble, where he has staged all of his plays, The Secret Capital, Follow Me, The Tower, In the Faraway Forest, Icone, Identity, Lost (Replay), and I Don't Remember Very Well.

He is fluent in both English and French.

He was awarded the Grand Prix de littérature dramatique in 2010 for his play Identité.

Filmography

References

External links

English male film actors
1965 births
Living people
Male actors from London
20th-century English male actors
21st-century English male actors